The Cathedral of the Nativity of Christ is a Coptic Orthodox cathedral in the as-yet-unnamed New Administrative Capital, Egypt, some 45 km east of Cairo. It was commissioned by the President of Egypt Abdel Fattah el-Sisi and inaugurated on 6 January 2019 by President el-Sisi and the Pope of the Coptic Orthodox Church of Alexandria Tawadros II. It is the largest church in the Middle East, and the largest Oriental Orthodox church in the world by area.

History
In January 2017, following twin terrorist attacks that killed at least 27 Coptic Egyptians at St. Peter and St. Paul's Church in Cairo in December 2016, the President of Egypt Abdel Fattah el-Sisi commissioned the construction of the country's largest mosque and church in the new administrative capital to become symbols of coexistence and national unity. For decades, the building of churches in Egypt was restricted to avoid offending Islam. However, in August 2017, the Parliament of Egypt removed the legal restrictions that limited the construction of new churches. The cathedral was built by the Egyptian presidency and by engineers from the Egyptian Armed Forces.

It was inaugurated on 6 January 2019 by President el-Sisi and Pope Tawadros II of Alexandria, the Pope of the Coptic Orthodox Church of Alexandria. On the same day of the inauguration, Divine Liturgy was celebrated in the chapel of the cathedral with the participation of some 3,000 people that included representatives from all over the country.

At the inauguration, President el-Sisi said,
"I want to say that this moment is very important in our history, because when I was at St Mark's Cathedral a year ago, I told the pope that we would be celebrating the completion of the mosque and the cathedral, and here we are standing together with the promise fulfilled. This occasion is a message that we will not allow anybody to come between us, and I do not like to use the term sectarian strife because Muslims and Christians in Egypt are one, and will stay one. This occasion represents a tree of love which we have planted together, but this tree still needs attention and care so that its fruit reaches from Egypt to the whole world. Strife will not end, but God saved Egypt and he will continue to do so for the sake of its people."

The Al-Fattah Al-Aleem Mosque was also inaugurated on the same day. Imam Sheikh Ahmed El-Tayeb called it "the embodiment of the soul of brotherhood and love".

Architecture

The design of the cathedral is inspired by Noah's Ark in accordance with Coptic tradition. It contains a main square and papal headquarters, a reception hall, a meeting room and administrative offices. It also has a two-story underground garage, service building, and two lighthouses. The lighthouses are Coptic in design and contain several bells at the top.

See also 

 List of largest church buildings in the world
 List of largest domes

References 

Cathedrals in Cairo
Christianity in Cairo
Coptic Orthodox churches in Cairo
Copts in Cairo
2019 establishments in Egypt
Churches completed in 2019
21st-century Oriental Orthodox church buildings
21st-century churches in Egypt